Carl Franklin (born April 11, 1949) is an American filmmaker. Franklin is a graduate of University of California, Berkeley, and continued his education at the AFI Conservatory, where he graduated with an M.F.A. degree in directing in 1986.

Early life
Franklin grew up  in Richmond, California.

He never had the opportunity to know his biological father, who had died before Carl was born. Franklin was raised by his mother and stepfather. While Franklin speaks highly of his stepfather and has called him "very loving", he has spoken out about his stepfather's abusive tendencies, linking his outbursts to alcohol use. Problems at home combined with life in a tough neighborhood fueled Franklin's ambition to be the first in his family to attend college. He was awarded a scholarship to University of California, Berkeley. Franklin's initial desires to become a teacher or lawyer led him to study history upon his arrival at the university. However, after two years, Franklin changed his major to theater arts. Franklin did not actively participate in the many demonstrations at Berkeley in the period. Describing the scene, Franklin told the LA Times: "It was like a dream to me, I wasn't really sophisticated enough to join a particular movement."

Acting career
After graduation, Franklin made his theater debut as a slave in The Public Theater's production of Timon of Athens. He would go on to act in Mark Taper Forum's production of In the Belly of the Beast.

One of his first jobs was acting in the New York Shakespeare Festival, where he appeared in the Twelfth Night and Cymbeline.

Franklin began his on-screen career in the film Five on the Black Hand Side in 1973. From there, he acted in a string of guest roles on television shows such as Barnaby Jones; episode titled "Focus on Fear" (January 31, 1980). The Rockford Files, Good Times, The Incredible Hulk and The Streets of San Francisco. Over the years, Franklin's looks have typically landed him roles portraying men of power, such as members of the police force or military officials.

Between 1975 and 1985 Franklin was a regular cast member in four TV series. The first, ABC's Caribe in 1975, was a law enforcement drama that aired 13 episodes and cast him as police sergeant Mark Walters. Two years later, NBC's fantasy-science fiction series The Fantastic Journey lasted for 10 episodes, with Franklin as athletic young physician Dr. Fred Walters. After four more years, a two-hour television film, McClain's Law, led to Franklin's second police series titled, per the telefilm, McClain's Law, a modern-day NBC vehicle for Gunsmoke star James Arness, with Franklin fifth-billed as police detective Jerry Cross, but the 1981–82 series only lasted 14 episodes. Franklin's longest lasting and most recognizable acting role was his 1983–85 portrayal of Captain Crane on the popular action-adventure series The A-Team.

Film career
Inspired by the low-budget films of the 1980s, such as Chan Is Missing (1982), Franklin enrolled at the AFI Conservatory in Los Angeles in 1986.

His 30-min AFI thesis film Punk is about an African-American boy in South-central Los Angeles dealing with his sexuality and manhood.

Straight out of his Master's program, Franklin landed a job with movie producer-director Roger Corman in 1989.

While working at Concord Films, Franklin gained experience working on low-budget films, helping to crank out six films in just two years' time. From 1989 to 1990, Franklin worked on Nowhere to Run, Eye of the Eagle 2: Inside the Enemy, and Full Fathom Five, respectively, under Concord Films.

At the end of the 80s, producer Jesse Beaton was looking for a director for a film called One False Move. Remembering Franklin's short film Punk, Beaton met Carl to discuss the film's vision.

Franklin's approach to the screenplay produced a thriller of the film noir genre. The story follows three drug dealers, played by Billy Bob Thornton, Cynda Williams, and Michael Beach and their interactions with a small-town Arkansas police chief played by Bill Paxton. Far from his low-budget past, Franklin's budget of $2 million gave him a bit of room to be creative, and achieve his entire vision for the film. However, the original version of the film, which was released in 1991, was thought to be overly violent. In response to such claims, Franklin told the Observer, "I didn't want people getting excited seeing how neat someone can be killed... I want the audience to feel the emotional loss of life--the real violence is the loss, the violation of humanity. They've taken from us someone who had dreams, hopes, the same set of emotions we have."

Despite the film's lack of professional publicity, One False Move was largely promoted by word of mouth and earned itself mixed reviews. However, the reviews that were positive were very positive, gaining the project more attention. The film was named Best Film of the Year by Gene Siskel, and one of the 10 Best Films of 1992 by the National Review Board.

Franklin collaborated with producers Jonathan Demme and Jesse Beaton on adapting Devil in a Blue Dress after Demme acquired its film rights. Franklin directed and wrote the screenplay for the film on a  budget.

Switching to television, Franklin directed Laurel Avenue, a two-part miniseries focused on an African-American family in Minnesota for HBO in 1993. One issue in particular that stood out in the series was the issue of drug use. Franklin defended his depictions, explaining that "Drugs are a huge problem in the black community. Not to include that would be a stupid oversight. But if the subject of drugs is introduced in the context of a hardworking family that has managed to maintain unity, and the audience sees drugs as a threat to that unity, they get a much greater understanding of the problem."

Following Laurel Avenue, Franklin found himself maintaining A-list status, which allowed him to work on bigger and more visible projects, such as 1998's One True Thing. The film is an adaptation of an autobiographical story by New York journalist Anna Quindlen, following a woman (Renée Zellweger) with no option but to leave Manhattan for the small town where she was raised when her mother (Meryl Streep) is diagnosed with cancer.

Race and film
Franklin says "I am interested in the universal values of the black experience."

Discussing the realities for African Americans in the television and film industry, Franklin said: "When I came up, the only legitimate dramatic actor was Sidney Poitier, the bankable star was Richard Pryor and the other choice roles were action parts that went to Jim Brown. Even someone as good as Billy Dee Williams had a couple of great moments and then couldn't get a decent part."

Personal life 
Franklin married film producer Jesse Beaton, who produced One False Move (1992).

Filmography

As actor

As himself

As director

Film

Television

Awards and nominations

References

External links
 

1949 births
Living people
Male actors from California
African-American male actors
African-American film directors
African-American television directors
African-American television producers
Television producers from California
American male film actors
AFI Conservatory alumni
American male screenwriters
American male television actors
American television directors
University of California, Berkeley alumni
People from Richmond, California
People from the San Francisco Bay Area
Film directors from California
Independent Spirit Award for Best Director winners
Screenwriters from California
Film producers from California
21st-century African-American people
20th-century African-American people